Germany competed at the 1952 Winter Olympics in Oslo, Norway after not having been invited to the 1948 Winter Olympics because of their role in World War II, and because the NOC restored in 1947 as Deutscher Olympischer Ausschuß did not represent a recognized state yet. The Federal Republic of Germany was founded in 1949, the NOC for Germany was renamed and in 1951 recognized by the IOC while recognition of a separate NOC of the GDR was declined. East Germans were told to cooperate in a single team Germany, which they declined in 1952, but accepted for 1956 and later.

Germany entered all events except the 1500 metres skating event, which was skipped by Germany's only speed skating entrant in favour of the other three events.

The IOC website currently uses both the codes GER or FRG for German medal winners, suggesting they represented two different teams:
 2/14/1952 Oslo 1952 Pairs Mixed - Gold FALK, Paul / FALK, Ria - Figure skating pairs mixed Germany
 2/14/1952 Oslo 1952 four-man Men - Gold FEDERAL REPUBLIC OF GERMANY 01 - Bobsleigh four-man men Federal Republic of Germany (1950–1990, "GER" since)

Medalists

Alpine skiing

Men

Women

Bobsleigh

Cross-country skiing

Men

Men's 4 × 10 km relay

Women

Figure skating

Men

Women

Pairs

Ice hockey

The tournament was run in a round-robin format with nine teams participating.

Canada 15-1 Germany
USA 8-2 Germany
Czechoslovakia 6-1 Germany
Sweden 7-3 Germany
Poland 4-4 Germany
Norway 2-6 Germany
Finland 5-1 Germany
Switzerland 6-3 Germany

Contestants
Karl Bierschel
Markus Egen
Karl Enzler
Georg Guggemos
Alfred Hoffmann
Engelbert Holderied
Walter Kremershof
Ludwig Kuhn
Dieter Niess
Hans Georg Pescher
Fritz Poitsch
Herbert Schibukat
Xaver Unsinn
Heinz Wackers
Karl Wild

Nordic combined 

Events:
 18 km cross-country skiing
 normal hill ski jumping

The cross-country skiing part of this event was combined with the main medal event, meaning that athletes competing here were skiing for two disciplines at the same time. Details can be found above in this article, in the cross-country skiing section.

The ski jumping (normal hill) event was held separate from the main medal event of ski jumping, results can be found in the table below (athletes were allowed to perform three jumps, the best two jumps were counted and are shown here).

Ski jumping

Speed skating

Men

References

 Olympic Winter Games 1952, full results by sports-reference.com

Nations at the 1952 Winter Olympics
1952
Olympics